Itajá may refer to the following places in Brazil:

 Itajá, Goiás
 Itajá, Rio Grande do Norte

See also
 Itajaí,a municipality in the state of Santa Catarina, Brazil